Mooloolah Valley is a rural locality in the Sunshine Coast Region, Queensland, Australia.

Mooloolah is a town within the locality.

Geography 
Mooloolah Valley is in the Sunshine Coast hinterland, north of Landsborough on the main railway line from Brisbane with regular services southbound to Brisbane and northbound to Nambour and Gympie from Mooloolah railway station.

The Mooloolah River forms part of the eastern boundary.

History
The name Mooloolah comes from the Kabi language meaning either place of black snakes or place of snapper.

In early 1861 the tender of Edmund Lander was accepted, by the Commissioner for Crown Lands, for the pastoral run of Mooloolah Plains in the Wide Bay and Burnett District. A year later the lease was transferred to John Westaway.

Lander went on to select  in 1869 on the main coach road between Brisbane and Gympie at the Mooloolah Bridge.  On this property the Mooloolah Post Office was established in 1872.

The town of Mooloolah was surveyed in 1884 by J.E. Palisser. The locality was originally called Mooloolah but this was changed to Mooloolah Valley on 2 June 1995.

Mooloolah Provisional School opened on 6 February 1894. On 1 January 1909 it became Mooloolah State School.

St Thomas' Anglican Church was dedicated on 22 April 1927 by Archdeacon Glover.

Glasshouse Country Uniting Church opened its church at Beerwah on 16 December 2000. It was a result of the merger of the Glasshouse Uniting Church, Beerwah Uniting Church, Landsborough Uniting Church and Mooloolah Uniting Church.

Heritage listings 
Mooloolah has a number of heritage-listed sites, including:

  south of Mooloolah township: Dularcha Railway Tunnel
 Maddock Park, Mooloolah Connection Road: Ewen Maddock House Site

Education 
Mooloolah State School is a government primary (Prep-6) school for boys and girls at King Road. In 2017, the school had an enrolment of 191 students with 16 teachers (14 full-time equivalent) and 12 non-teaching staff (8 full-time equivalent).

Amenities 
Mooloolah Valley Community Association is a not-for-profit organisation based at Mooloolah Community Centre, raising money, providing services and events to the local community including:

 Op Shop
 4 Seasons Markets
 Community Assistance Program – providing practical help for residents who find themselves in difficult circumstances
 a program of community events (e.g. Emergency Services Day, Community BBQ, Christmas celebrations).
 a Men's Shed is in the development stage.

Mooloolah Public Hall was officially opened in 1905 and provides a space for community events (e.g. concerts, markets, exercise classes, clubs).

The Sunshine Coast Regional Council operates a mobile library service which visits Bray Road.

St Thomas' Anglican Church is at 31 Bray Road. Weekly services are held on Wednesday.

References

External links
 
 
 The Mooloolah Community Centre is the home and work hub of Mooloolah Valley Community Association Inc.

Suburbs of the Sunshine Coast Region
Localities in Queensland